Ubiquitin-conjugating enzyme E2 G2 is a protein that in humans is encoded by the UBE2G2 gene.

The modification of proteins with ubiquitin is an important cellular mechanism for targeting abnormal or short-lived proteins for degradation. Ubiquitination involves at least three classes of enzymes: ubiquitin-activating enzymes, or E1s, ubiquin-conjugating enzymes, or E2s, and ubiquitin-protein ligases, or E3s. This gene encodes a member of the E2 ubiquitin-conjugating enzyme family. The encoded protein shares 100% sequence identity with the mouse counterpart. This gene is ubiquitously expressed, with high expression seen in adult muscle. Two alternatively spliced transcript variants encoding distinct isoforms have been found for this gene.   Ube2g2 is known to interact with a variety of other proteins, including ubiquitin, the E3 gp78, and the Hrd1 RING.

References

Further reading

External links